Statistics of Veikkausliiga in the 1997 season.

Overview
It was contested by 10 teams, and HJK Helsinki won the championship.

League standings

Haka Valkeakoski as winners of the 1997 Finnish Cup from the lower division qualified for the qualifying round of the 1998–99 Cup Winners' Cup.

Results

Matches 1–18

Matches 19–27

See also
Suomen Cup 1997

References
Finland - List of final tables (RSSSF)

Veikkausliiga seasons
Fin
Fin
1